Bonanza is a census-designated place in eastern Uintah County, Utah, United States. The name refers to a rich mineral strike.

Near the community is a coal-fired power plant owned by Deseret Power Electric Cooperative.  Bonanza is also in the area of the Colorado Plateau where oil drilling and extraction takes place from oil shale and other fossil fuel deposits. According to the 2010 Census, Bonanza has a population of 0.

History
Bonanza was established in 1888. The basis for establishing the community was a discovery of Gilsonite, a natural asphalt substance.

Geography

Climate
According to the Köppen Climate Classification system, Bonanza has a semi-arid climate, abbreviated "BSk" on climate maps.

See also

 List of census-designated places in Utah

References

External links

 Vernal Express

Mining communities in Utah
Census-designated places in Uintah County, Utah
Census-designated places in Utah